The Hărpășești is a right tributary of the river Bahlueț in Romania. It flows into the Bahlueț in Scobâlțeni.

References

Rivers of Romania
Rivers of Iași County